Christ United Church of Christ, also known as The Little German Church, is a United Church of Christ church located in Baltimore, Maryland. It was formerly a German Reformed church.

History
Christ United Church was founded in 1886 as the "Vereinigte Evangelische Christus Gemeinde" (United Evangelical Community Church of Christ). It was founded by German immigrants and was originally affiliated with the Reformed Church in the United States. The church was officially dedicated on June 9, 1888. Prior to 1910, all church services were held in the German language; since then the services have been offered in both German and English.

The congregation opened "The Evangelical Immigrant and Seamen’s Home" next to the church in 1904. This 'immigrant house' was created to serve immigrants and seamen who traveled to Baltimore; German, Irish, and Polish immigrants in particular were served. The immigrant mission operated until 1939.

In 1957, the church became affiliated with the United Church of Christ, the successor denomination to the German Reformed tradition. It formally recognized the affiliation in its name in 1972.

See also
History of the Germans in Baltimore

References

External links
 Sweet thoughts about sour beef

1886 establishments in Maryland
Churches completed in 1886
Churches in Baltimore
German-American culture in Baltimore
Irish-American culture in Baltimore
Locust Point, Baltimore
Polish-American culture in Baltimore
United Church of Christ churches in Maryland